Bridge Cafe was a historic restaurant and bar located at 279 Water Street in the South Street Seaport area of Manhattan, New York City, United States. The site was originally home to "a grocery and wine and porter bottler", opened in 1794, and has been home to a series of drinking and eating establishments. In the nineteenth century, the building was described in city directories variously as a grocery, a porterhouse, or a liquor establishment. Henry Williams operated a brothel there from 1847 to 1860 and the prostitutes were listed in the New York City census of 1855. In 1888, the building's exterior was altered to its present form. The building was damaged during Hurricane Sandy, and the restaurant remains closed . Until its closure, it was the city's oldest continuous business establishment, though the name and ownership had changed numerous times. It had  most recently been under the same ownership since 1979, when the former McCormick’s, a bar frequented by local fishmongers, was purchased by Jack Weprin and converted into The Bridge Cafe, a  white tablecloth establishment. 

While in office, Mayor Edward I. Koch regularly had dinner at Bridge Cafe and declared it to be his favorite restaurant.

New York considered it to be one of New York City's Top 5 Historic Bars in 2005.

A 2020 report states that "it unfortunately closed after Hurricane Sandy inundated the building in 2012 and has remained closed ever since". A reconstruction did commence but a report in March 2020 stated that owner Adam Weprin had encountered difficulties; at that time, he said that "'Unfortunately, many factors will play a part in the opening. In addition to replacing the floors, there are other costly repairs' ... but he remained committed to a reopening.

References

External links

Drinking establishments in Manhattan
Defunct restaurants in New York City
South Street Seaport
1794 establishments in New York (state)
Restaurants established in 1794